Luc Desnoyers (born October 2, 1950) is a Canadian trade unionist and politician, who was elected to represent the electoral district of Rivière-des-Mille-Îles in the 2008 Canadian federal election. He is a member of the Bloc Québécois.

After one term in office, he was defeated in the 2011 election by Laurin Liu of the New Democratic Party.

External links
 

1950 births
Trade unionists from Quebec
Bloc Québécois MPs
Living people
Members of the House of Commons of Canada from Quebec
People from Saint-Jérôme
21st-century Canadian politicians